Stephen Corry (born 1951) is a British indigenous rights activist, better known as the CEO of Survival International. He was asked to lead the organisation in 1984. In 1993 he became the chairman of the Free Tibet Campaign and remains on its board.

Biography 
Stephen Corry was born in Malaysia in 1951. He won a scholarship to Gresham's School, where he excelled in rifle shooting. At the age 16, he left school with the desire to travel and learn other languages. He travelled to places like Nepal, Turkey and India. As his mother was born in India, he was particularly interested in learning about the country. At 18 he found himself at Mount Everest, Nepal. With no money or support, Corry had to rely on the local people for sustenance. Corry has stated in interviews that before his interaction with the Himalayan tribes, he had always believed in the spread of Western-style technologies around the world. His experience with these people completely changed his way of thinking. He found them to be living very fulfilling lives without electricity or cars. He became even more interested in learning about the tribal people of the world. When he returned to London he thought he would feel out of place. However, in 1972, he found the organisation Survival International. The organisation was re-launching at the time, and he was happy to find there people who thought the way he did. Influenced by his travels, and authors such as Jiddu Krishnamurti, he quit the University of Paris, Jussieu, and volunteered. After becoming a member, Corry sought to go to Brazil to study the indigenous people there, but was asked to stay in London and do research.

Stephen Corry later became Projects Director of Survival International. According to explorer and Survival's founder and President, Robin Hanbury-Tenison, after several long field trips to South America on their behalf, combined with an ability to relate to Amerindians and anthropologists, Corry had become an expert on the status of the Indians of Colombia, Peru and Ecuador. He had started his work with Survival with the ambitious intention of compiling a World Red Book of Threatened Peoples – parallel to the IUCN's  "Red Book of Threatened Species", an idea which was proposed to him by Robin Hanbury-Tenison, while discussing his future role in Survival International. In 1974 he spent nine months in Colombia researching the situation of the indigenous tribal peoples and setting up several projects for funding by the Joint Projects Committee. On his return, in 1976, he published his report, "Towards Indian Self-determination in Colombia". Since 1984, he has served as Director-General of Survival International. Corry is a climber and ski-tourer. He lives in the West Country, England, is married and the father of three daughters.

In August 2020, Corry announced that he will step down as CEO of Survival International in 2021.

Views 

Stephen Corry has worked as a member of Survival International with the perspective that indigenous people have both moral and legal rights to their lands. The protection of this right is considered essential for their survival. They believe that governments must acknowledge this and that this is only possible if they are made to by force of public opinion. Survival International believes that the culture of this people is of great value, and it is now put at great risk from a violent interference on their way of living.

Awards
Survival International was awarded the Right Livelihood Award in 1989. Corry gave the acceptance speech.

See also 
David Maybury-Lewis
Davi Kopenawa Yanomami
Roy Sesana

References

Further reading

Eede, Joanna (2009). We are One: A Celebration of Tribal Peoples. Quadrille Publishing. 
Corry, Stephen (2011). Tribal peoples for tomorrow's world. Freeman Press. 
Watson, F., & Corry, S. (2000). Disinherited: Indians in Brazil. Survival International. 
Stephen Corry's acceptance speech for the Rightlivelihood Award
Life Support  – RSA Journal, February 2005
Tomorrow’s tribes. The world’s tribal peoples in the 21st century. – Geographical, September 2004
The Rainforest Harvest: Who Reaps the Benefit? – The Ecologist, Vol.23, No. 4, July/August 1993
Harvest Moonshine – A critique of the "rainforest harvest" – Survival International
Survival and the Bushmen of the Central Kalahari Game Reserve: 39 questions – Interview with Stephen Corry about the Bushmen situation, June 2006

External links 

Survival International
Free Tibet Campaign

Living people
People educated at Gresham's School
British anthropologists
British human rights activists
Indigenous rights activists
Tibet freedom activists
1951 births